Ross Powers (born February 10, 1979) is an American world champion halfpipe snowboarder and Olympic gold medalist. Hailing from South Londonderry, Vermont, he is currently the director of the snowboarding program at the Stratton Mountain School in Stratton, Vermont and a philanthropist.

Career
Though he originally rode at Stratton Mountain, Vermont, his home mountain is now Okemo, Vermont. Powers helps with the design of the Superpipe and also helped design the RossCross Family Terrain Park. Powers also runs a snowboard camp through Okemo. He led the U.S. sweep in the 2002 Winter Olympics men's halfpipe competition, one day after his 23rd birthday. This is the first time the Americans have swept a Winter Olympic event since the men's figure skaters in 1956. Powers, with a score of 46.1, dominated the competition.

During his final run, Powers dropped in and aired out with an 18-foot method grab (a world record at that time), and followed up with two McTwists, a cab 720 indy grab, a frontside 720 indy grab and a switch frontside air.

He regularly competes in such events as the US and European Opens of Snowboarding, the Vans Triple Crown (now known simply as the Vans Cup), and the X-Games. During the 2004/2005 season, Ross won the Mt. Bachelor Grand Prix event and went on to be the overall champion for the series.

In 2007 Powers shifted gears and returned to racing in snowboard cross. He had his first world cup podium in that discipline in February 2009 at Sunday River, Maine, and again in December 2009 at Telluride, Colorado.

In 2010 Powers narrowly missed earning a spot on the US Olympic Team for snowboard cross. He finished the season with his SBX World Cup rank at 11th.

In April 2010 Powers was named director of the snowboarding program at The Stratton Mountain School (SMS), in Vermont. Powers is a 1997 graduate of SMS. His current snowboard sponsor is RAMP Sports.

Powers resides in Stratton, Vermont, with his wife Marisa and daughters, Victoria and Meredith.

Video game appearances
Powers is a playable character in the video game Shaun Palmer's Pro Snowboarder. and the video game Cool Boarders 4.

Philanthropy

In 2001 Powers founded the non-profit Ross Powers Foundation, a philanthropic organization that is dedicated to providing financial aid to promising athletes from all economic backgrounds. In 2010, the Foundation provided assistance to a number of up-and-coming snowboarders.

In 2010 The Ross Powers Foundation teamed up with Olympic gold medalist Michael Phelps and formed the Level Field Fund, a non-profit organization with the mission statement: "The Level Field Fund strives to bridge gaps in funding for uniquely talented athletes, following the belief that opportunities to pursue excellence in sport should not be limited by an athlete's financial situation."

References

External links
 
 
 
 
 
 Off the Podium website
 Ross Powers Foundation

1979 births
Living people
People from Bennington, Vermont
American male snowboarders
Sportspeople from Vermont
People from Windsor County, Vermont
Snowboarders at the 2002 Winter Olympics
Snowboarders at the 1998 Winter Olympics
Medalists at the 2002 Winter Olympics
Medalists at the 1998 Winter Olympics
Olympic gold medalists for the United States in snowboarding
Olympic bronze medalists for the United States in snowboarding
X Games athletes